Gerarus is an extinct genus of Archaeorthopteran insect, and is one of the most abundant genera of Carboniferous insects.

References

Carboniferous insects
Carboniferous arthropods of North America
Prehistoric insects of Europe
Prehistoric insect genera
Insect enigmatic taxa
Fossil taxa described in 1885